Maxime Stefani (born 10 March 1998) is a French professional rugby league footballer who plays as a  forward for Toulouse Olympique in the Betfred Championship and France at international level.

In February 2022 Stefani made his Toulouse début in the Super League against the Warrington Wolves.

In October 2022 he was named in the France squad for the 2021 Rugby League World Cup.

References

External links
Toulouse Olympique profile
SL profile
France profile
French profile

1998 births
Living people
France national rugby league team players
French rugby league players
Rugby league second-rows
Saint-Gaudens Bears players
Toulouse Olympique players